is a passenger railway station located in the city of Matsuyama, Ehime Prefecture, Japan. It is operated by JR Shikoku and has the station number "Y46".

Lines
Connections with other local or limited express trains are needed to travel further east or west along the line.

Layout
The station, which is unstaffed, consists of a side platform and an island platform serving two tracks. A passing siding runs on the other side of the island platform and is served by freight platform which is used for the loading of ballast. A station building serves as a waiting room and is linked to platform 1. Access to platform 2 (the island platform) is by means of a footbridge. Parking is available at the station forecourt.

Adjacent stations

History
At that time the station was operated by Japanese Government Railways, later becoming Japanese National Railways (JNR). With the privatization of JNR on 1 April 1987, control of the station passed to JR Shikoku.

Surrounding area
Japan National Route 198.

See also
 List of railway stations in Japan

References

External links
Station timetable

Railway stations in Ehime Prefecture
Railway stations in Japan opened in 1926
Railway stations in Matsuyama, Ehime